The Association of European Rarities Committees is a co-ordinating and liaison body for the bird rarities committees of Europe and other nearby countries.

It was created in 1993 at a meeting of European rarities committees on the German island of Heligoland.

The association's aims are as follows:

 Encourage the founding of a national rarities committee in every European country
 Provide help for national committees when requested to do so
 Prepare and maintain a European bird list
 Organize meetings of delegates of the national committees at approximately two-year intervals to maintain personal contact, information exchange and co-operation

For a list of AERC members, see List of the member committees of the Association of European Rarities Committees

External links
 https://web.archive.org/web/20060824023904/http://www.aerc.eu/ AERC Website

References 

Bird rarities committees